Olivier de Sagazan (born 1959 in Brazzaville, Congo) is a French artist, painter, sculptor and performer. His most famous performance  “Transfiguration” was created in 1998, with more than 300 performances in 25 countries.  In this fascinating performance "Transfiguration", Sagazan changes identities on stage from man to animal and from animal to various hybrid creatures. He pierces, obliterates and unravels the layers on his face in a frenzied search for new essence and form. In this regard he has stated “I am flabbergasted in seeing to what degree people think it’s normal, or even trite, to be alive”. In "Transfiguration" he gives new meaning to the notion of life, offering a captivating, disturbing and stirring glimpse into an alternative selfhood utterly unconstrained by inhibition.

His performance “Transfiguration” has led to numerous collaborations with artists such as:
FKA Twigs
Ron Fricke for the movie Samsara
Qiu Yang for the movie O produced by Hou Hsiao-hsien
Gareth Pugh and Nick Knight
Wim Vandekeybus
David Wahl

Television
In Channel Zero: Candle Cove he portrays The Skin Taker.

See also 
Performance art

References

External links 

 
 A journey to the edge of anxiety: an interview with Olivier de Sagazan with Art Media Agency

French sculptors
French male sculptors
French performance artists
People from Brazzaville
1959 births
Living people